Helmuth M. Backhaus (1920–1989) was a German actor, screenwriter and film director.

Selected filmography

Screenwriter
 Love on Ice (1950)
 The Model Husband (1956)
 At Green Cockatoo by Night (1957)
 The Schimeck Family (1957)
 The Star of Santa Clara (1958)
 The Csardas King (1958)
 The Night Before the Premiere (1959)
 Yes, Women are Dangerous (1960)
 The White Horse Inn (1960)
 The Adventures of Count Bobby (1961)

Director
 Apartmentzauber (1963)
 If You Go Swimming in Tenerife (1964)
 The Bandits of the Rio Grande (1965)

Actor
 Weekend in Paradise (1952)
 That Can Happen to Anyone (1952)
 Scandal at the Girls' School (1953)

References

Bibliography 
 Flowers, John & Frizler, Paul. Psychotherapists on Film, 1899-1999. McFarland & Company, 2004.

External links 
 

1920 births
1989 deaths
Film people from North Rhine-Westphalia
German male film actors
Mass media people from Bonn
20th-century German male actors
German male writers